Venice in Peril may refer to:

 Venice in Peril Fund, a British charity that raises funds to restore and conserve works of art and architecture in Venice
 Venice in Peril Records, a sub-label of EMI Records formed in 1982
 La Serenissima (album), a 1981 album by Rondò Veneziano, also released as Venice in Peril